Nemophora cassiterites is a moth of the Adelidae family or fairy longhorn moths. It was described by Edward Meyrick in 1907. It is found in India.

References

Adelidae
Moths described in 1907
Moths of Asia
Endemic fauna of India